Audrey Lemieux (born 9 May 1985) is a road cyclist from Canada. She represented her nation at the 2005 UCI Road World Championships.

References

External links
 profile at Procyclingstats.com

1985 births
Canadian female cyclists
Living people
Place of birth missing (living people)
20th-century Canadian women
21st-century Canadian women